The VGV U70 is a 5- to 7-seat mid-size crossover SUV produced by VGV, a sub-brand of Weichai (Chongqing) Automotive from 2019.

History 
As early as January 2019, the winter testing spy photos of the Weichai Enranger 7-seat crossover SUV has been seen in the Chinese media. By August 2019, images of the Weichai Enranger U70 has been obtained from the China MIIT, and at the time declared as an all-new SUV model from Weichai Enranger. In November 2019, the Weichai U70 was launched. Despite marketed as a Weichai brand vehicle, the show car wears the VGV logo. As of 2020, Chinese automotive media has been labeling the VGV U70 under the VGV brand of China National Heavy Duty Truck Group while in article mentions, the name remains to be Weichai U70.

Powertrain 
The VGV U70 is powered by a 1.5 liter inline-four turbo engine producing 156Ps and 115 kW, with the engine mated to either a 6-speed manual gearbox or a 6-speed automatic gearbox.

VGV U75 Plus 
The U75 Plus is a sportier and more premium variant of the U70 featuring slightly redesigned exterior details and a more powerful powertrain. The U75 Plus is powered by a 2.0-litre turbo engine mated to an 8-speed automatic transmission developing 224 hp and 385N·m.

VGV VX7 
The VGV VX7 is a sport utility truck or ute variant of the U75 Plus featuring the same front end design and powertrain. A version of the VX7 equipped with a slantback rear cover was also unveiled at the same time dubbed the "Pet's First Class" edition. The VX7 has a top speed of 196 kilometers per hour. The cargo bed dimensions are 1114mm by 1438mm by 588mm and is capable of a 330 kg tent carrying capacity.

References

External links 

 Official Website

Cars introduced in 2019
Mid-size sport utility vehicles
Front-wheel-drive vehicles
2010s cars
Cars of China
Pickup trucks